Caloptilia pyrrhaspis is a moth of the family Gracillariidae. It is known from China (Sichuan), Japan (Hokkaidō, Honshū) and the Russian Far East.

The wingspan is 11–12 mm.

The larvae feed on Betula dahurica, Betula ermanii, Betula grossa and Betula platyphylla. They mine the leaves of their host plant.

References

pyrrhaspis
Moths of Asia
Moths described in 1931